Tide is an unincorporated community in Lane County, Oregon, United States, on Oregon Route 36, about six miles (10 km) east of its junction with Oregon Route 126 in Mapleton, near the Siuslaw River.  Tide is managed by a small elected council of local residents, including Mayor Jessica McCumber, and Sheriff Carlton Banks.

References 

Unincorporated communities in Lane County, Oregon
Unincorporated communities in Oregon